Callia lineatula is a species of beetle in the family Cerambycidae. It was described by Lane in 1973. It is known from French Guiana and Brazil.

References

Calliini
Beetles described in 1973